A Literature Lesson  is a 1968 Soviet comedy film directed by Alexey Korenev.

Plot 
The film tells about a teacher who does not like his work. He understands that something needs to be changed and from now he decides to speak only the truth. This leads to conflicts at school and in personal life.

Cast 
 Yevgeny Steblov as Konstantin Mikhailovich, teacher of literature
 Leonid Kuravlyov as Savely Sidorov
 Inna Makarova as Vera Petrovna
 Valentina Malyavina as Nina Vronskaya
 Yevgeny Leonov as Pavel Petrovich Vronsky
 Nina Agapova as student's mother
 Lyubov Dobrzhanskaya	 as Anna Tyurina
 Victoria Fyodorova  as Lena
 Anatoly Linkov as Kolya Sobakin
 Andrey Mironov as Felix
 Gotlib Roninson as Igor Raimondovich

References

External links 
 

1968 films
1960s Russian-language films
Soviet comedy films
1968 comedy films
Films scored by Eduard Artemyev
Mosfilm films
Soviet teen films

Tragicomedy films
Films based on short fiction